Palaeopagurus is an extinct genus of hermit crab from the Lower Cretaceous.

References

Hermit crabs
Early Cretaceous crustaceans
Fossil taxa described in 1925
Early Cretaceous arthropods of Europe
Cretaceous England
Fossils of England